Derry is a surname. Among those with the name are:

 Duncan R. Derry (1906–87) Canadian economic geologist. 
 John Derry (1921–52)  British test pilot
 Reigan Derry (born 1988) Australian singer and songwriter
 Russ Derry (1916 – 2004) American baseball player
 Shaun Derry (born 1977) English footballer
 Tiffany Derry (born 1982) American chef

See also
 Derry (given name)
 Derry (disambiguation)